The Battle of Huamantla was a U.S. victory late in the Mexican–American War that forced the Mexican Army to lift the siege of Puebla.

Background
Santa Anna left Puebla at the end of Sept., to intercept Joseph Lane's relief column, planning an ambush at Paso del Pintal. Learning of Santa Anna's men at Huamantla, Lane left his train under guard and marched toward that city, Captain Samuel H. Walker's four companies of cavalry in the lead.

Battle
Walker charged, upon seeing Santa Anna's lancers, driving the Mexicans from the town. Santa Anna led a counterattack, Walker was shot by a civilian in a nearby house, and his men retreated into a church. The Mexicans then retreated to Querétaro.

Lane turned his troops loose in a drunken sack of the town.  They reached Puebla on 12 Oct. to lift the siege.

Order of battle

United States

Mexico
Mexican Army: General Antonio López de Santa Anna

See also
 Battles of the Mexican–American War

References

Further reading
 Nevin, David; editor, The Mexican War (1978)

External links
 From the Baltimore Republican and Argus
 A Continent Divided: The U.S. - Mexico War, Center for Greater Southwestern Studies, the University of Texas at Arlington

1847 in Mexico
Huamantla
Huamantla
History of Tlaxcala
October 1847 events